Tokushima may refer to:

 Tokushima Prefecture, a prefecture in western Japan
 Tokushima, Tokushima, the capital city of Tokushima Prefecture
 Tokushima at-large district, a former constituency of the House of Councillors in the Diet of Japan